Florence Mary Canning (19 May 1863 – 24 December 1914) was a British suffragette and Chair of the Executive Committee of the Church League for Women's Suffrage.

Early life

Canning was born in Hereford on 19 May 1863. She was the eldest daughter of the Reverend Thomas Canning, vicar of Tupsley and his wife Elizabeth Hampden Phillips. Florence had six siblings, four brothers and two sisters, one of whom, Frances Ethel Canning, became an author and Conservative Church suffragist Little is known about Florence’s early life; she appears on the 1871 census as a scholar, but then subsequent census records have no information on occupation or profession. She performed with a number of other pupils of Dr Herbert Wareing in a concert at the Public Hall in Worcester in July 1889.

Activism

Canning joined the Women’s Social and Political Union (WSPU) in 1906. She appears on the Suffragette Roll of Honour having been imprisoned at least twice, firstly in 1908 when she was sent to Holloway Prison after being arrested on a deputation to the Prime Minister.  

Florence convalesced on more than on occasion at Eagle House, Batheaston (home of the Blathwayt family) where she planted an Oregon cedar at Annie’s Arboretum on 25 April 1909. She was injured in the Black Friday protests on 18 November 1910 but never regained her health, being subsequently diagnosed with breast cancer. Florence was elected as Chairman of the Executive of the Church League for Women's Suffrage (CLWS) in early 1912 before ill-health later forced her to resign. She did attend the General Council meeting of the CLWS which took place in Brighton in July 1913, and appears in a photograph taken by Muriel Darton alongside other delegates including two Indian women.

Canning was “most decidedly in favour” of the ordination of women, in correspondence to Ursula Roberts dating from 1913.

Newspaper reports show Florence travelling the country to speak about suffrage, with her last public act being a member of a deputation to the King in May 1914, when she was once again arrested. In addition to the CWLS and the WSPU, Canning was a speaker on behalf of the Conservative and Unionist Women's Franchise Association (CUWFA). She was said to be ‘an indefatigable worker and most effective speaker’.  She also worked for the East London Federation of Suffragettes, established by Sylvia Pankhurst.

Later life

Florence did not live to see women win the vote. She died on Christmas Eve 1914 in Brighton, where her death was certified by Dr Louisa Martindale. Florence’s coffin was brought back to Hereford where she was interred with her family at St Paul’s Church, Tupsley. Members of the WSPSU attended her funeral, and Florence was buried with a wreath in the WSPU colours of purple, white and green on her grave.

A fund was set up in her memory by her friends, including CUWFA member, Gertrude Eaton, to raise money for the Women’s Hospital for Children. By 1917 it had collected £265 to equip and furnish an operating theatre in Canning’s memory. Her tree in the aboreatum at Eagle House in Batheaston was bulldozed with dozens of others in the 1960s.

In 2018, she was honoured with a Violet Plaque, an initiative of Hereford Cathedral funded by the National Lottery. In 2022 an appeal was launched by a local suffrage researcher to raise £1,000 to renovate her grave.

References

1863 births
1914 deaths
People from Hereford
English suffragettes